Cameron Bell is a New Zealand rugby league coach. He is a member of the famous Bell rugby league family that includes George, Ian, Dean (his son) and Cathy and Clayton Friend.

Coaching career
As coach of the Manukau Magpies, in 1985 he won the Hyland Memorial Cup as Auckland Rugby League's coach of the year. In 1988 Bell was appointed Auckland coach, a position he held for two seasons.

Between February 1990 and April 1994 Bell was the coach of Carlisle in England.

He returned to New Zealand in 1995, taking up the position of head coach of the New Zealand Māori side, a job he would hold until the 2000 World Cup.

He coached the Counties Manukau Heroes to a grand final victory in the 1996 Lion Red Cup.

Bell coached the Ngongotaha Chiefs in the 2001 Bartercard Cup.

References

Living people
Auckland rugby league team coaches
Barrow Raiders coaches
Carlisle RLFC coaches
Counties Manukau rugby league team coaches
Manukau Magpies coaches
New Zealand rugby league coaches
New Zealand Māori rugby league team coaches
Year of birth missing (living people)